Jama Masjid Mosque is the oldest, major and prevalent mosque in Furus, in the Ratnagiri district of Maharashtra, India. Jaama Masjid, is a reference to the weekly Friday noon congregation prayers of Muslims, which are usually done at a mosque, the "congregational mosque" or "jaama masjid".

Structure
The courtyard of the mosque can hold up to five hundred worshipers. Jama Masjid Mosque is a very simple, bold, vast and majestic in its expression. It is crowned by large dome made up of masonry cement. There is inscriptions in the mosque on the gateway.

Mosques in Maharashtra
Furus